Abu Sayeed Chowdhury (31 January 1921 – 2 August 1987) was a jurist and the President of Bangladesh. Besides that, he held the positions of the Chairmen of the United Nations Commission on Human rights, the vice-chancellor of the University of Dhaka, the Foreign Minister of Bangladesh and the first Bangladesh High Commissioner to the UK.

Early life and education
Chowdhury was born on 31 January 1921 in a Zamindar family of Nagbari in Tangail District. His father Abdul Hamid Chowdhury apart from being a Zamindar become the speaker of the East Pakistan Provincial Assembly later on in his life. He was given the title "Khan Bahadur" by the British Empire, a title which he later renounced to give his voice to the movement against British atrocities and the British Empire.

Chowdhury graduated in 1940 from the Presidency College in Calcutta. He obtained his master's and law degrees from University of Calcutta in 1942 and after the second world war he completed bar-at-law in London.

Career

Chowdhury joined the Calcutta High Court Bar in 1947, and after the partition of India he came over to Dhaka and joined the Dhaka High Court Bar in 1948. In 1960, he was appointed as the advocate general of East Pakistan. He was elevated to the post of Additional Judge of the Dhaka High Court on 7 July 1961 by the then Pakistani President Ayub Khan and was confirmed as judge of the Dhaka High Court after two years. He had been a member of the Constitution Commission (1960–61) and chairman of the Bengali Development Board (1963–1968).

Chowdhury was appointed as the vice-chancellor of the University of Dhaka in 1969. In 1971, while in Geneva he resigned from the post as a protest against the genocide in East Pakistan by the Pakistan army. From Geneva he went to the UK and became the special envoy of the provisional Mujibnagar Government. An umbrella organisation, The Council for the People's Republic of Bangladesh in UK was formed on 24 April 1971 in Coventry, UK, by the expatriate Bengalis, and a five-member steering committee of the council was elected by them. He was the High Commissioner for the People's Republic of Bangladesh, London from 1 August 1971 to 8 January 1972.

President of Bangladesh
After liberation, Chowdhury returned to Dhaka and was elected as President of Bangladesh on 12 January 1972. On 10 April 1973, he was again elected as President of Bangladesh, and in the same year (December) he resigned and become special envoy for external relations with the rank of a minister. On 8 August 1975, he was included in the cabinet of Sheikh Mujibur Rahman as minister of ports and shipping. After Rahman was assassinated, he became the minister for foreign affairs in the cabinet of President Khondaker Mostaq Ahmad in August 1975, a position which he held till 7 November the same year.

UN Committee
In 1978, Chowdhury was elected a member of the United Nations Sub-committee on Prevention of Discrimination and Protection of Minorities. In 1985, he was elected chairman of the UN Human Rights Commission. He was honoured with the insignia of Deshikottam by Visva-Bharati University. Calcutta University awarded him the honorary degree of Doctor of Law.

Death and legacy 
Chowdhury died of a heart attack in London on 2 August 1987 and was buried in his village, Nagbari of Tangail.

Controversy 
Right after the assassination of Sheikh Mujibur Rahman, Abu Sayeed Chowdhury joined the cabinet of the new government as the foreign minister and praised the mastermind of the assassination Khondaker Mostaq Ahmad by saying, "President Khondaker Mostaq Ahmad believes in democracy and he wants to restore democratic atmosphere in the country."

Books
 Probashe Muktijuddher Dinguli
 Manobadhikar
 Human Rights in the Twentieth Century
 Muslim Family Law in the English Courts

References

External links
 
 

1921 births
1987 deaths
People from Tangail District
University of Calcutta alumni
Presidency University, Kolkata alumni
Vice-Chancellors of the University of Dhaka
Awami League politicians
Presidents of Bangladesh
Foreign ministers of Bangladesh
Honorary Fellows of Bangla Academy